The Singles, Volume I: The Federal Years: 1956–1960 (also known as The Federal Years: 1956–1960) is the first compilation in a series of releases by Hip-O Select Records compiling the singles of James Brown. This compilation features all 7" single releases, including re-issues and canceled singles. Most of the songs in this collection feature backing vocals by Brown's vocal group, The Famous Flames.

Track listing
All tracks credited to James Brown & the Famous Flames; except where indicated
Disc 1
"Please, Please, Please" – 2:43
"Why Do You Do Me" – 3:00
"I Don't Know" – 2:49
"I Feel That Old Feeling Coming On" – 2:32
"No, No, No, No" – 2:12
"Hold My Baby's Hand" – 2:13
"I Won't Plead No More" – 2:25
"Chonnie-On-Chon" – 2:12
"Just Won't Do Right" – 2:34
"Let's Make It" – 2:25
"Gonna Try" – 2:44
"Can't Be the Same" – 2:20
"Messing with the Blues" – 2:09 – James Brown
"Love or a Game" – 2:17 – James Brown
"You're Mine, You're Mine" – 2:31
"I Walked Alone" – 2:39
"That Dood It" – 2:29
"Baby Cries Over the Ocean" – 2:22
"Begging, Begging" – 2:52
"That's When I Lost My Heart" – 2:49
"Try Me" [Demo Version] (Bonus Track) – 2:29

Disc 2
"Try Me" – 2:31
"Tell Me What I Did Wrong" – 2:22
"I Want You So Bad" – 2:45
"There Must Be a Reason" – 2:26
"I've Got to Change" (Mono) – 2:25
"It Hurts to Tell You" (Mono) – 2:52
"I've Got to Change" [Stereo Version] – 2:25
"It Hurts to Tell You" [Stereo Version] – 2:51
"Doodle Bee" (Instrumental) – 2:38 – James Davis
"Bucket Head" – 2:47 – James Davis
"It Was You" – 2:42
"Got to Cry" – 2:35
"Good Good Lovin'" – 2:14
"Don't Let It Happen to Me" – 2:50
"I'll Go Crazy" – 2:06
"I Know It's True" – 2:40
"Think" – 2:47
"You've Got the Power" – 2:20 – James Brown and Bea Ford
"This Old Heart" – 2:09
"Wonder When You're Coming Home" – 2:32

References

James Brown compilation albums
2006 compilation albums